Tim Stearn (born April 25, 1948) is an American sailor. He competed in the Flying Dutchman event at the 1972 Summer Olympics.

References

External links
 

1948 births
Living people
American male sailors (sport)
Olympic sailors of the United States
Sailors at the 1972 Summer Olympics – Flying Dutchman
Sportspeople from Evanston, Illinois